Economic corridors are integrated networks of infrastructure within a geographical area designed to stimulate economic development. They connect different economic agents in particular geographic area. Corridors may be developed within a country or between countries. Corridors exist in Asia, Africa, and other areas.

Economic corridors often feature integrated infrastructure, such as highways, railroads and ports, and may link cities or countries. Corridors may be created to link manufacturing hubs, areas with high supply and demand, and manufacturers of value-added goods. When implemented, economic corridors are often one of a package of different measures including infrastructure development, visa and transport agreements, and standardisation. Consideration of social needs, such as housing, is often considered.

The Asian Development Bank coined the term in 1998.

In practice the term "economic corridors" has most often been used to connote road highways (e.g. East-West Economic Corridor and Southern Economic Corridor of the Greater Mekong Subregion program (GMS)). The China-Pakistan Economic Corridor is also anchored on transport connectivity though it also includes several power plants. More recent work has emphasized the need for a clear link of the linear infrastructure (like roads) to broader, spatial economic activities. A corridor exemplifying this is the Almaty–Bishkek Economic Corridor (ABEC).

Benefits 
Regional integration

Economic corridors not only connect regions and countries through transportation, but also strengthens infrastructure construction by establishing industrial clusters, thereby attracting investment and developing regional economy. They are part of infrastructure and integrated economic strategy. As Brunner points out: "They do not stand alone, as their role in regional economic development can be comprehended only in terms of the network effects that they induce".

Economic development

A well-functioning industrial cluster will greatly stimulate economic development. As part of a comprehensive strategic development plan and integrated economic network, the economic corridor will integrate economic development in several regions, within a country, and between neighbouring countries. Due to the reduction of transportation and communication costs, smooth connection of various industrial chains, and the shortening of delivery time, many costs have been saved during economic production. At the same time, the economic corridor can also promote the development of other local industries, such as tourism and hotels. 

Employment

As a development strategy and infrastructure construction, the economic corridor will drive the development of regional industries and create thousands of local jobs. Among them, the tourism industry, hotel industry, catering industry and other service industries will gain huge development opportunities. In addition, the transnational economic corridor will also stimulate the development of foreign trade, and people in different countries can expand the scope of trade by taking advantage of convenient transportation conditions. 

Living standards

The development of employment, commerce and trade will greatly increase the incomes of local people. In addition, some basic living facilities will also be developed, such as public transportation, banking, medical facilities, education and so on. Especially in some remote areas, due to the development of transportation, residents can receive education and medical services nearby, and living conditions are greatly facilitated.

Critics
Crowding out effect

The construction of economic corridors requires huge capital investment, and related risks such as white elephant investment or unfair public investment will sacrifice the interests of many small businesses and local residents and benefit a few large corporations. Some scholars pointed out that “Large investment in corridors risk crowding out other public investment in critical areas, such as education, water and sanitation, and health”. 

Environmental externalities

The construction of some economic corridors have a negative impact on nature reserves, forest parks and wildlife reserves, etc., which will cause huge damage to the local environment and biodiversity, especially some endangered species. At the same time, air pollution, water pollution and noise pollution caused by industrial construction will also deteriorate the local fragile ecosystem, and the lives of residents along the route will also be greatly disturbed. Some residents living on agriculture will face problems such as soil erosion and water pollution. 

Resettlement and migration

The construction of an economic corridor that crosses the residential area will force local residents to move to other areas or resettle, causing them to lose cultivated land or commercial land, employment, interpersonal relationships. The cost of readjusting to a new life cannot be ignored. 

Destruction of historical and cultural monuments

Industrial construction may cause damage to cultural monuments along the route. Such damage may be unintentional, but it is a huge loss of human civilization. 

Other problems

The improvement of roads will increase the probability of traffic accidents and human trafficking. At the same time, residents along the GMS Southern Economic Corridor worry that the construction of the economic corridor will promote the spread of AIDS, because the development of living facilities in the surrounding areas, such as the development of the hotel industry and brothels, will provide places for sexual services.

Examples
 China–Pakistan Economic Corridor
 Central Asia Regional Economic Cooperation Program
 China–Central Asia–West Asia Economic Corridor
 Khyber Pass Economic Corridor
 Trans-Himalayan Multi-dimensional Connectivity Network
 Sarawak Corridor of Renewable Energy
 Nanning–Singapore Economic Corridor
 East–West Economic Corridor
 Mumbai-Bangalore economic corridor
 Eastern Economic Corridor
 Eastern Economic Corridor (India)
 Bangladesh–China–India–Myanmar Forum for Regional Cooperation
 East-West Industrial Corridor Highway, Arunachal Pradesh

See also
 Industrial corridor
 Infrastructure Development Finance Company
 Environmental issues

References

Economic geography
Transport in Asia
Transport in Africa